In mathematics, the cross product or vector product (occasionally directed area product, to emphasize its geometric significance) is a binary operation on two vectors in a three-dimensional oriented  Euclidean vector space (named here ), and is denoted by the symbol . It has many applications in mathematics, physics, engineering, and computer programming. It should not be confused with the dot product (projection product).

If two vectors have the same direction or have the exact opposite direction from each other (that is, they are not linearly independent), or if either one has zero length, then their cross product is zero. More generally, the magnitude of the product equals the area of a parallelogram with the vectors for sides; in particular, the magnitude of the product of two perpendicular vectors is the product of their lengths.

The cross product is anticommutative (that is) and is distributive over addition (that is). The space  together with the cross product is an algebra over the real numbers, which is neither commutative nor associative, but is a Lie algebra with the cross product being the Lie bracket.

Like the dot product, it depends on the metric of Euclidean space, but unlike the dot product, it also depends on a choice of orientation (or "handedness") of the space (it's why an oriented space is needed). In connection with the cross product, the exterior product of vectors can be used in arbitrary dimensions (with a bivector or 2-form result) and is independent of the orientation of the space.

The product can be generalized in various ways, using the orientation and metric structure just as for the traditional 3-dimensional cross product, one can, in  dimensions, take the product of  vectors to produce a vector perpendicular to all of them. But if the product is limited to non-trivial binary products with vector results, it exists only in three and seven dimensions. The cross-product in seven dimensions has undesirable properties, however (e.g. it fails to satisfy the Jacobi identity), so it is not used in mathematical physics to represent quantities such as multi-dimensional space-time. (See § Generalizations, below, for other dimensions.)

Definition 

In physics and applied mathematics, the wedge notation  is often used (in conjunction with the name vector product), although in pure mathematics such notation is usually reserved for just the exterior product, an abstraction of the vector product to  dimensions.

The cross product  is defined as a vector c that is perpendicular (orthogonal) to both a and b, with a direction given by the right-hand rule and a magnitude equal to the area of the parallelogram that the vectors span.

The cross product is defined by the formula

where:

 θ is the angle between a and b in the plane containing them (hence, it is between 0° and 180°)
 ‖a‖ and ‖b‖ are the magnitudes of vectors a and b
 and n is a unit vector perpendicular to the plane containing a and b, with direction such that the ordered set (a, b, n) is positively-oriented.

If the vectors a and b are parallel (that is, the angle θ between them is either 0° or 180°), by the above formula, the cross product of a and b is the zero vector 0.

Direction 

The direction of the vector n depends on the chosen orientation of the space. Conventionally, it is given by the right-hand rule, where one simply points the forefinger of the right hand in the direction of a and the middle finger in the direction of b. Then, the vector n is coming out of the thumb (see the adjacent picture). Using this rule implies that the cross product is anti-commutative; that is, . By pointing the forefinger toward b first, and then pointing the middle finger toward a, the thumb will be forced in the opposite direction, reversing the sign of the product vector.

As the cross product operator depends on the orientation of the space, in general the cross product of two vectors is not a "true" vector, but a pseudovector. See  for more detail.

Names and origin 

In 1842, William Rowan Hamilton discovered the algebra of quaternions and the non-commutative Hamilton product. In particular, when the Hamilton product of two vectors (that is, pure quaternions with zero scalar part) is performed, it results in a quaternion with a scalar and vector part. The scalar and vector part of this Hamilton product corresponds to the negative of dot product and cross product of the two vectors.  

In 1881, Josiah Willard Gibbs, and independently Oliver Heaviside, introduced the notation for both the dot product and the cross product using a period and an "×", respectively, to denote them.

In 1877, to emphasize the fact that the result of a dot product is a scalar while the result of a cross product is a vector, William Kingdon Clifford coined the alternative names scalar product and vector product for the two operations. These alternative names are still widely used in the literature.

Conversely, a dot product  involves multiplications between corresponding components of a and b. As explained below, the cross product can be expressed in the form of a determinant of a special  matrix. According to Sarrus's rule, this involves multiplications between matrix elements identified by crossed diagonals.

Computing

Coordinate notation 

If (i, j, k) is a positively oriented orthonormal basis, the basis vectors satisfy the following equalities

which imply, by the anticommutativity of the cross product, that 

The anticommutativity of the cross product (and the obvious lack of linear independence) also implies that
 (the zero vector).

These equalities, together with the distributivity and linearity of the cross product (though neither follows easily from the definition given above), are sufficient to determine the cross product of any two vectors a and b. Each vector can be defined as the sum of three orthogonal components parallel to the standard basis vectors:

Their cross product  can be expanded using distributivity:

This can be interpreted as the decomposition of  into the sum of nine simpler cross products involving vectors aligned with i, j, or k. Each one of these nine cross products operates on two vectors that are easy to handle as they are either parallel or orthogonal to each other. From this decomposition, by using the above-mentioned equalities and collecting similar terms, we obtain:

meaning that the three scalar components of the resulting vector s = s1i + s2j + s3k =  are

Using column vectors, we can represent the same result as follows:

Matrix notation 

The cross product can also be expressed as the formal determinant:

This determinant can be computed using Sarrus's rule or cofactor expansion. Using Sarrus's rule, it expands to

Using cofactor expansion along the first row instead, it expands to

which gives the components of the resulting vector directly.

Using Levi-Civita tensors 
 In any basis, the cross-product  is given by the tensorial formula  where  is the covariant Levi-Civita tensor (we note the position of the indices). That corresponds to the intrinsic formula given here.
 In an orthonormal basis having the same orientation as the space,  is given by the pseudo-tensorial formula  where  is the Levi-Civita symbol (which is a pseudo-tensor). That’s the formula used for everyday physics but it works only for this special choice of basis.
 In any orthonormal basis,  is given by the pseudo-tensorial formula  where  indicates whether the basis has the same orientation as the space or not.

The latter formula avoids having to change the orientation of the space when we inverse an orthonormal basis.

Properties

Geometric meaning 

The magnitude of the cross product can be interpreted as the positive area of the parallelogram having a and b as sides (see Figure 1):

Indeed, one can also compute the volume V of a parallelepiped having a, b and c as edges by using a combination of a cross product and a dot product, called scalar triple product (see Figure 2):

Since the result of the scalar triple product may be negative, the volume of the parallelepiped is given by its absolute value:

Because the magnitude of the cross product goes by the sine of the angle between its arguments, the cross product can be thought of as a measure of perpendicularity in the same way that the dot product is a measure of parallelism. Given two unit vectors, their cross product has a magnitude of 1 if the two are perpendicular and a magnitude of zero if the two are parallel. The dot product of two unit vectors behaves just oppositely: it is zero when the unit vectors are perpendicular and 1 if the unit vectors are parallel.

Unit vectors enable two convenient identities: the dot product of two unit vectors yields the cosine (which may be positive or negative) of the angle between the two unit vectors. The magnitude of the cross product of the two unit vectors yields the sine (which will always be positive).

Algebraic properties 

The self cross product of a vector is the zero vector:

The cross product is anticommutative,

distributive over addition,
 
and compatible with scalar multiplication so that

It is not associative, but satisfies the Jacobi identity:

Distributivity, linearity and Jacobi identity show that the R3 vector space together with vector addition and the cross product forms a Lie algebra, the Lie algebra of the real orthogonal group in 3 dimensions, SO(3).
The cross product does not obey the cancellation law; that is,  with  does not imply , but only that:

for some scalar t.

As  cannot be simultaneously parallel (for the cross product to be 0) and perpendicular (for the dot product to be 0) to a, it must be the case that b and c cancel: .

In formulae:

More generally, the cross product obeys the following identity under matrix transformations:

It can be readily seen how this formula reduces to the former one if  is a rotation matrix. If  is a 3-by-3 symmetric matrix applied to a generic cross product , the following relation holds true: 

The cross product of two vectors lies in the null space of the  matrix with the vectors as rows:

For the sum of two cross products, the following identity holds:

Differentiation 

The product rule of differential calculus applies to any bilinear operation, and therefore also to the cross product:

where a and b are vectors that depend on the real variable t.

Triple product expansion 

The cross product is used in both forms of the triple product. The scalar triple product of three vectors is defined as

It is the signed volume of the parallelepiped with edges a, b and c and as such the vectors can be used in any order that's an even permutation of the above ordering. The following therefore are equal:

The vector triple product is the cross product of a vector with the result of another cross product, and is related to the dot product by the following formula

The mnemonic "BAC minus CAB" is used to remember the order of the vectors in the right hand member. This formula is used in physics to simplify vector calculations. A special case, regarding gradients and useful in vector calculus, is

where ∇2 is the vector Laplacian operator.

Other identities relate the cross product to the scalar triple product:

where I is the identity matrix.

Alternative formulation 
The cross product and the dot product are related by:

The right-hand side is the Gram determinant of a and b, the square of the area of the parallelogram defined by the vectors. This condition determines the magnitude of the cross product. Namely, since the dot product is defined, in terms of the angle θ between the two vectors, as:

the above given relationship can be rewritten as follows:

Invoking the Pythagorean trigonometric identity one obtains:

which is the magnitude of the cross product expressed in terms of θ, equal to the area of the parallelogram defined by a and b (see definition above).

The combination of this requirement and the property that the cross product be orthogonal to its constituents a and b provides an alternative definition of the cross product.

Lagrange's identity 
The relation:

can be compared with another relation involving the right-hand side, namely Lagrange's identity expressed as:

where a and b may be n-dimensional vectors. This also shows that the Riemannian volume form for surfaces is exactly the surface element from vector calculus. In the case where , combining these two equations results in the expression for the magnitude of the cross product in terms of its components:
 

The same result is found directly using the components of the cross product found from:

In R3, Lagrange's equation is a special case of the multiplicativity  of the norm in the quaternion algebra.

It is a special case of another formula, also sometimes called Lagrange's identity, which is the three dimensional case of the Binet–Cauchy identity:

If  and  this simplifies to the formula above.

Infinitesimal generators of rotations 
The cross product conveniently describes the infinitesimal generators of rotations in R3. Specifically, if n is a unit vector in R3 and R(φ, n) denotes a rotation about the axis through the origin specified by n, with angle φ (measured in radians, counterclockwise when viewed from the tip of n), then

for every vector x in R3. The cross product with n therefore describes the infinitesimal generator of the rotations about n. These infinitesimal generators form the Lie algebra so(3) of the rotation group SO(3), and we obtain the result that the Lie algebra R3 with cross product is isomorphic to the Lie algebra so(3).

Alternative ways to compute

Conversion to matrix multiplication 
The vector cross product also can be expressed as the product of a skew-symmetric matrix and a vector:

where superscript  refers to the transpose operation, and [a]× is defined by:

The columns [a]×,i of the skew-symmetric matrix for a vector a can be also obtained by calculating the cross product with unit vectors. That is,

or

where  is the outer product operator.

Also, if a is itself expressed as a cross product:

then

This result can be generalized to higher dimensions using geometric algebra. In particular in any dimension bivectors can be identified with skew-symmetric matrices, so the product between a skew-symmetric matrix and vector is equivalent to the grade-1 part of the product of a bivector and vector.  In three dimensions bivectors are dual to vectors so the product is equivalent to the cross product, with the bivector instead of its vector dual. In higher dimensions the product can still be calculated but bivectors have more degrees of freedom and are not equivalent to vectors.

This notation is also often much easier to work with, for example, in epipolar geometry.

From the general properties of the cross product follows immediately that
   and   
and from fact that [a]× is skew-symmetric it follows that

The above-mentioned triple product expansion (bac–cab rule) can be easily proven using this notation.

As mentioned above, the Lie algebra R3 with cross product is isomorphic to the Lie algebra so(3), whose elements can be identified with the 3×3 skew-symmetric matrices. The map a → [a]× provides an isomorphism between R3 and so(3). Under this map, the cross product of 3-vectors corresponds to the commutator of 3x3 skew-symmetric matrices.

{| class="toccolours collapsible collapsed" width="70%" style="text-align:left"
!Matrix conversion for cross product with canonical base vectors
|-

These matrices share the following properties:
  (skew-symmetric);
 Both trace and determinant are zero;
 ;
  (see below);

For other properties of orthogonal projection matrices, see projection (linear algebra).
|}

Index notation for tensors
The cross product can alternatively be defined in terms of the Levi-Civita tensor Eijk and a dot product ηmi, which are useful in converting vector notation for tensor applications:

where the indices  correspond to vector components.  This characterization of the cross product is often expressed more compactly using the Einstein summation convention as

in which repeated indices are summed over the values 1 to 3.

In that case, this representation is another form of the skew-symmetric representation of the cross product:

In classical mechanics: representing the cross product by using the Levi-Civita symbol can cause mechanical symmetries to be obvious when physical systems are isotropic. (An example: consider a particle in a Hooke's Law potential in three-space, free to oscillate in three dimensions; none of these dimensions are "special" in any sense, so symmetries lie in the cross-product-represented angular momentum, which are made clear by the abovementioned Levi-Civita representation).

Mnemonic 

The word "xyzzy" can be used to remember the definition of the cross product.

If

where:

then:

The second and third equations can be obtained from the first by simply vertically rotating the subscripts, . The problem, of course, is how to remember the first equation, and two options are available for this purpose: either to remember the relevant two diagonals of Sarrus's scheme (those containing i), or to remember the xyzzy sequence.

Since the first diagonal in Sarrus's scheme is just the main diagonal of the above-mentioned 3×3 matrix, the first three letters of the word xyzzy can be very easily remembered.

Cross visualization 
Similarly to the mnemonic device above, a "cross" or X can be visualized between the two vectors in the equation. This may be helpful for remembering the correct cross product formula.

If

then:

When doing this for  the next two elements down should "wrap around" the matrix so that after the z component comes the x component. While for  the next two components should be taken as x and y.

For  then, if we visualize the cross operator as pointing from an element on the left to an element on the right, we can take the first element on the left and simply multiply by the element that the cross points to in the right hand matrix. We then subtract the next element down on the left, multiplied by the element that the cross points to here as well. This results in our  formula –

Applications 
The cross product has applications in various contexts. For example, it is used in computational geometry, physics and engineering.
A non-exhaustive list of examples follows.

Computational geometry 
The cross product appears in the calculation of the distance of two skew lines (lines not in the same plane) from each other in three-dimensional space.

The cross product can be used to calculate the normal for a triangle or polygon, an operation frequently performed in computer graphics. For example, the winding of a polygon (clockwise or anticlockwise) about a point within the polygon can be calculated by triangulating the polygon (like spoking a wheel) and summing the angles (between the spokes) using the cross product to keep track of the sign of each angle.

The sign of the acute angle is the sign of the expression

which is the signed length of the cross product of the two vectors.

From another point of view, the sign of  tells whether  lies to the left or to the right of line 

The cross product is used in calculating the volume of a polyhedron such as a tetrahedron or parallelepiped.

Angular momentum and torque 
The angular momentum  of a particle about a given origin is defined as:

  

where  is the position vector of the particle relative to the origin,  is the linear momentum of the particle.

In the same way, the moment  of a force  applied at point B around point A is given as:

  

In mechanics the moment of a force is also called torque and written as 

Since position  linear momentum  and force  are all true vectors, both the angular momentum  and the moment of a force  are pseudovectors or axial vectors.

Rigid body 
The cross product frequently appears in the description of rigid motions. Two points P  and Q on a rigid body can be related by:

 

Since position  and velocity  are true vectors, the angular velocity  is a pseudovector or axial vector.

Lorentz force 

The cross product is used to describe the Lorentz force experienced by a moving electric charge 
 

Since velocity  force  and electric field  are all true vectors, the magnetic field  is a pseudovector.

Other 
In vector calculus, the cross product is used to define the formula for the vector operator curl.

The trick of rewriting a cross product in terms of a matrix multiplication appears frequently in epipolar and multi-view geometry, in particular when deriving matching constraints.

As an external product 

The cross product can be defined in terms of the exterior product. It can be generalized to an external product in other than three dimensions. This view allows a natural geometric interpretation of the cross product. In exterior algebra the exterior product of two vectors is a bivector. A bivector is an oriented plane element, in much the same way that a vector is an oriented line element. Given two vectors a and b, one can view the bivector  as the oriented parallelogram spanned by a and b. The cross product is then obtained by taking the Hodge star of the bivector , mapping 2-vectors to vectors:

 

This can be thought of as the oriented multi-dimensional element "perpendicular" to the bivector. Only in three dimensions is the result an oriented one-dimensional element – a vector – whereas, for example, in four dimensions the Hodge dual of a bivector is two-dimensional – a bivector. So, only in three dimensions can a vector cross product of a and b be defined as the vector dual to the bivector : it is perpendicular to the bivector, with orientation dependent on the coordinate system's handedness, and has the same magnitude relative to the unit normal vector as  has relative to the unit bivector; precisely the properties described above.

Handedness

Consistency 
When physics laws are written as equations, it is possible to make an arbitrary choice of the coordinate system, including handedness. One should be careful to never write down an equation where the two sides do not behave equally under all transformations that need to be considered. For example, if one side of the equation is a cross product of two polar vectors, one must take into account that the result is an axial vector. Therefore, for consistency, the other side must also be an axial vector. More generally, the result of a cross product may be either a polar vector or an axial vector, depending on the type of its operands (polar vectors or axial vectors). Namely, polar vectors and axial vectors are interrelated in the following ways under application of the cross product:

 polar vector × polar vector = axial vector
 axial vector × axial vector = axial vector
 polar vector × axial vector = polar vector
 axial vector × polar vector = polar vector
or symbolically
 polar × polar = axial 
 axial × axial = axial 
 polar × axial = polar 
 axial × polar = polar

Because the cross product may also be a polar vector, it may not change direction with a mirror image transformation. This happens, according to the above relationships, if one of the operands is a polar vector and the other one is an axial vector (e.g., the cross product of two polar vectors). For instance, a vector triple product involving three polar vectors is a polar vector.

A handedness-free approach is possible using exterior algebra.

The paradox of the orthonormal basis 
Let (i, j,k) be an orthonormal basis. The vectors i, j and k  don't depend on the orientation of the space. They can even be defined in the absence of any orientation. They can not therefore be axial vectors. But if  i and j are polar vectors then k is an axial vector for  i × j = k or  j × i = k. This is a paradox.

"Axial" and "polar" are physical qualifiers for physical vectors; that is, vectors which represent physical quantities such as the velocity or the magnetic field. The vectors i, j and k  are mathematical vectors, neither axial nor polar. In mathematics, the cross-product of two vectors is a vector. There is no contradiction.

Generalizations 
There are several ways to generalize the cross product to higher dimensions.

Lie algebra 

The cross product can be seen as one of the simplest Lie products, and is thus generalized by Lie algebras, which are axiomatized as binary products satisfying the axioms of multilinearity, skew-symmetry, and the Jacobi identity. Many Lie algebras exist, and their study is a major field of mathematics, called Lie theory.

For example, the Heisenberg algebra gives another Lie algebra structure on  In the basis  the product is

Quaternions 

The cross product can also be described in terms of quaternions.
In general, if a vector  is represented as the quaternion , the cross product of two vectors can be obtained by taking their product as quaternions and deleting the real part of the result. The real part will be the negative of the dot product of the two vectors.

Octonions 

A cross product for 7-dimensional vectors can be obtained in the same way by using the octonions instead of the quaternions. The nonexistence of nontrivial vector-valued cross products of two vectors in other dimensions is related to the result from Hurwitz's theorem that the only normed division algebras are the ones with dimension 1, 2, 4, and 8.

Exterior product 

In general dimension, there is no direct analogue of the binary cross product that yields specifically a vector. There is however the exterior product, which has similar properties, except that the exterior product of two vectors is now a 2-vector instead of an ordinary vector. As mentioned above, the cross product can be interpreted as the exterior product in three dimensions by using the Hodge star operator to map 2-vectors to vectors.  The Hodge dual of the exterior product yields an -vector, which is a natural generalization of the cross product in any number of dimensions.

The exterior product and dot product can be combined (through summation) to form the geometric product in geometric algebra.

External product 
As mentioned above, the cross product can be interpreted in three dimensions as the Hodge dual of the exterior product. In any finite n dimensions, the Hodge dual of the exterior product of  vectors is a vector. So, instead of a binary operation, in arbitrary finite dimensions, the cross product is generalized as the Hodge dual of the exterior product of some given  vectors. This generalization is called external product.

Commutator product 

 

where  is the geometric product.

The commutator product could be generalised to arbitrary multivectors in three dimensions, which results in a multivector consisting of only elements of grades 1 (1-vectors/true vectors) and 2 (2-vectors/pseudovectors). While the commutator product of two 1-vectors is indeed the same as the exterior product and yields a 2-vector, the commutator of a 1-vector and a 2-vector yields a true vector, corresponding instead to the left and right contractions in geometric algebra. The commutator product of two 2-vectors has no corresponding equivalent product, which is why the commutator product is defined in the first place for 2-vectors. Furthermore, the commutator triple product of three 2-vectors is the same as the vector triple product of the same three pseudovectors in vector algebra. However, the commutator triple product of three 1-vectors in geometric algebra is instead the negative of the vector triple product of the same three true vectors in vector algebra.

Generalizations to higher dimensions is provided by the same commutator product of 2-vectors in higher-dimensional geometric algebras, but the 2-vectors are no longer pseudovectors. Just as the commutator product/cross product of 2-vectors in three dimensions correspond to the simplest Lie algebra, the 2-vector subalgebras of higher dimensional geometric algebra equipped with the commutator product also correspond to the Lie algebras. Also as in three dimensions, the commutator product could be further generalised to arbitrary multivectors.

Multilinear algebra 
In the context of multilinear algebra, the cross product can be seen as the (1,2)-tensor (a mixed tensor, specifically a bilinear map) obtained from the 3-dimensional volume form, a (0,3)-tensor, by raising an index.

In detail, the 3-dimensional volume form defines a product  by taking the determinant of the matrix given by these 3 vectors. By duality, this is equivalent to a function  (fixing any two inputs gives a function  by evaluating on the third input) and in the presence of an inner product (such as the dot product; more generally, a non-degenerate bilinear form), we have an isomorphism  and thus this yields a map  which is the cross product: a (0,3)-tensor (3 vector inputs, scalar output) has been transformed into a (1,2)-tensor (2 vector inputs, 1 vector output) by "raising an index".

Translating the above algebra into geometry, the function "volume of the parallelepiped defined by " (where the first two vectors are fixed and the last is an input), which defines a function , can be represented uniquely as the dot product with a vector: this vector is the cross product  From this perspective, the cross product is defined by the scalar triple product, 

In the same way, in higher dimensions one may define generalized cross products by raising indices of the n-dimensional volume form, which is a -tensor.
The most direct generalizations of the cross product are to define either:
 a -tensor, which takes as input  vectors, and gives as output 1 vector – an -ary vector-valued product, or
 a -tensor, which takes as input 2 vectors and gives as output skew-symmetric tensor of rank  – a binary product with rank  tensor values.  One can also define -tensors for other k.

These products are all multilinear and skew-symmetric, and can be defined in terms of the determinant and parity.

The -ary product can be described as follows: given  vectors  in  define their generalized cross product  as:
 perpendicular to the hyperplane defined by the 
 oriented so that  is positively oriented.

In coordinates, one can give a formula for this -ary analogue of the cross product in Rn by:

This formula is identical in structure to the determinant formula for the normal cross product in R3 except that the row of basis vectors is the last row in the determinant rather than the first. The reason for this is to ensure that the ordered vectors (v1, ..., vn−1, Λvi) have a positive orientation with respect to (e1, ..., en). If n is odd, this modification leaves the value unchanged, so this convention agrees with the normal definition of the binary product. In the case that n is even, however, the distinction must be kept. This -ary form enjoys many of the same properties as the vector cross product: it is alternating and linear in its arguments, it is perpendicular to each argument, and its magnitude gives the hypervolume of the region bounded by the arguments. And just like the vector cross product, it can be defined in a coordinate independent way as the Hodge dual of the wedge product of the arguments. Moreover, the product  satisfies the Filippov identity,

and so it endows Rn+1 with a structure of n-Lie algebra (see Proposition 1 of ).

History 
In 1773, Joseph-Louis Lagrange used the component form of both the dot and cross products in order to study the tetrahedron in three dimensions.

In 1843, William Rowan Hamilton introduced the quaternion product, and with it the terms vector and scalar. James Clerk Maxwell used Hamilton's quaternion tools to develop his famous electromagnetism equations, and for this and other reasons quaternions for a time were an essential part of physics education.

In 1844, Hermann Grassmann published a geometric algebra not tied to dimension two or three. (See also: exterior algebra.)

In 1853, Augustin-Louis Cauchy, a contemporary of Grassmann, published a paper on algebraic keys which were used to solve equations and had the same multiplication properties as the cross product.

In 1878, William Kingdon Clifford published Elements of Dynamic, in which the term vector product is attested. In the book, this product of two vectors is defined to have magnitude equal to the area of the parallelogram of which they are two sides, and direction perpendicular to their plane. (See also: Clifford algebra.)

In 1901, Gibb's student Edwin Bidwell Wilson edits and extends these lecture notes into the textbook Vector Analysis. Wilson keeps the term skew product, but observes that the alternative terms cross product and vector product were more frequent.

In 1908, Cesare Burali-Forti and Roberto Marcolongo introduce the vector product notation . This is used in France and other areas until this day, as the symbol  is already used to denote multiplication and the cartesian product.

See also 
 Cartesian product – a product of two sets
 Geometric algebra: Rotating systems
 Multiple cross products – products involving more than three vectors
 Multiplication of vectors
 Quadruple product
 × (the symbol)

Notes

References

Bibliography 
 
 
 E. A. Milne (1948) Vectorial Mechanics, Chapter 2: Vector Product, pp 11 –31, London: Methuen Publishing.

External links 
 
 A quick geometrical derivation and interpretation of cross products
 An interactive tutorial created at Syracuse University – (requires java)
 W. Kahan (2007). Cross-Products and Rotations in Euclidean 2- and 3-Space. University of California, Berkeley (PDF).
 The vector product, Mathcentre (UK), 2009

Bilinear maps
Operations on vectors
Analytic geometry